Ukiyo-e artists may be organized into schools, which consist of a founding artist and those artists who were taught by or strongly influenced by him.  Artists of the Osaka school are united both stylistically and geographically.  Not all of these artists designed woodblock prints, and some ukiyo-e artists had more than one teacher, and others are not known to be associated with any particular school.

Asayama school (in Osaka)

Asayama Ashikuni (founder)
Ashisato
Ashifune
Ashihiro
Ashikiyo
Asayama Ashitaka
Asayama Ashitomo
Gigadō Ashiyuki (Nagakuni)
Jukōdō Yoshilkuni

Eishi school (also known as Hosoda school)

Chōbunsai Eishi (founder)
Ichirakute Eisui
Chōkōsai Eishō
Chōkyōsai Eiri
Gessai Gabimaru
Chōensai Eishin
Rekisentei Eiri
Harukawa Eizan

Furuyama school

Furuyama Moroshige (founder)
Furuyama Moromasa
Furuyama Morotane
Furuyama Morotsugu

Harukawa Eizan school

Harukawa Eizan (founder)
Harukawa Goshichi
Harukawa Eichō

Harunobu school

Suzuki Harunobu (founder)
Isoda Koryūsai
Shiba Kōkan (Suzuki Harushige)
Yasunobu
Komai Yoshinobu
Suzuki Haruji
Masunobu
Mitsunobu
Naka Kuninobu
Morino Sōgyoku
Ueno Shōha

Hasegawa school (in Osaka)

Hasegawa Sadanobu I (founder)
Hasegawa Sadanobu II
Hasegawa Settan
Hasegawa Settei

Hishikawa school (also known as the Moronobu school)

Hishikawa Moronobu (founder)
Hishikawa Morofusa
Hishikawa Moroyoshi
Hishikawa Moronaga
Hishikawa Moroshige
Hishikawa Morohira
Tamazaki Ryūjo

Hokusai school

Katsushika Hokusai (Shunrō, Sōri, Taitō)
Katsushika Ōi
Yanagawa Shigenobu
Yanagawa Nobusada (Yanagawa Yukinobu)
Hishikawa Sōri
Katsushika Hokumei
Teisai Hokuba
Maki Bokusen
Numata Gessai
Shōtei Hokuju
Totoya Hokkei
Ryūryūkyo Shinsai
Hōtei Gosei
Katsushika Hokuun
Katsushika Taito II
Katsushika Isai
Katsushika Hokui
Enkōan

Ippitsusai Bunchō school

Ippitsusai Bunchō (founder)
Tsumuri no Hikaru
Tamagawa Shūchō

Ishikawa Toyonobu school

Ishikawa Toyonobu (founder)
Ishikawa Toyomasa

Kaigetsudō school

Kaigetsudō Ando (founder)
Kaigetsudō Anchi
Kaigetsudō Dohan
Kaigetsudō Doshin
Kaigetsudō Doshu
Kaigetsudō Doshū
Hasegawa Eishun (Baiōken Eishun)
Matsuno Chikanobu

Katsukawa school (also known as the Shunshō school)

Katsukawa Shunshō (founder)
Koikawa Harumachi I
Katsukawa Shunrō
Katsukawa Shun'ei
Katsukawa Shuntei
Katsukawa Shun'en
Katsukawa Shundō II
Katsukawa Shunrin
Katsukawa Shōju
Katsukawa Shundō
Katsukawa Shunzan
Katsukawa Shunjō
Katsukawa Shunsen (Katsukawa Shunkō II)
Katsukawa Shunchō
Katsukawa Shunkō I
Katsukawa Shungyō
Tamagawa Shunsui
Kinchōdō Sekiga
Katsukawa Shunri
Katsukawa Shunwa

Kawamata school

 Kawamata Tsuneyuki
 Kawamata Tsunemasa
 Kawamata Tsunetatsu

Keisai Eisen school

Keisai Eisen (founder)
Isono Bunsai
Yamatoya Sada
Teisai Senchō
Senshōtei Toyotsuru

Kitagawa school (also known as Utamaro school)

Kitagawa Utamaro (founder)
Kitagawa Utamaro II
Maki Bokusen
Kitagawa Chiyojo
Kitagawa Fujimaro
Kitagawa Tsukimaro
Chōchōdō Kagenori
Kitagawa Yukimaro
Kitagawa Shikimaro
Kitagawa Yoshimaro
Eishōsai Chōki
Kitagawa Hidemaro
Juka Sekijō
Soraku
Michimaro
Chikanobu
Bunrō
Isomaro
Hishikawa Ryūkoku
Rakumaro
Minemaro
Senman

Kitao school (also known as the Shigemasa school)

Kitao Shigemasa (founder)
Kitao Shigemasa II
Kubo Shunman
Kitao Masanobu
Kitao Masayoshi

Koikawa school

Koikawa Harumachi I (founder)
Koikawa Harumachi II
Koikawa Harumasa
Koikawa Hakuga

Kondō school

Kondō Kiyoharu (founder)
Kondō Kiyonobu
Kondō Katsunobu

Miyagawa school

Miyagawa Chōshun (founder)
Miyagawa Isshō
Miyagawa Chōki
Miyagawa Shunsui

Nishikawa school (also known as the Sukenobu school)

Nishikawa Sukenobu (founder)
Nishikawa Suketada
Kawashima Nobukiyo
Nishikawa Terunobu
Takagi Sadatake

Nishimura school (also known as the Shigenaga school)

Nishimura Shigenaga (founder)
Ishikawa Toyonobu
Nishimura Shigenobu
Suzuki Harunobu
Yamamoto Fujinobu
Tomikawa Fusanobu
Yamamoto Yoshinobu
Hirose Shigenobu

Okumura school (also known as the Masanobu school)

Okumura Masanobu (founder)
Okumura Nobufusa
Okumura Toshinobu
Tanaka Masunobu
Mangetsudō

Ōoka school (in Osaka)

Ōoka Shunboku (founder)
Takehara Shunchōsai

Osaka school

Ryūkōsai Jokei (founder)
Shōkōsai Hanbei
Shunkōsai Hokushū (Shunkō IV)
Ashikuni
Ashiyuki (Nagakuni)
Enjaku
Yoshida Hanbei
Hikokuni
Hironobu
Hirosada I
Hirosada II
Shunbaisai Hokuei (Shunkō III)
Hokumyō
Kagematsu
Kikyo
Kiyosada
Kunihiro
Kunikazu
Kunimasu (Sadamasu) 
Kunishige
Mitsukuni
Munehiro
Nagahide
Nobukatsu
Yanagawa Nobusada
Sadahiro I
Sadahiro II
Sadanobu I
Sadanobu II
Sadayoshi
Shigefusa
Shigeharu
Shigenobu  
Shunkyō
Shunshi
Shunshō
Shûshō
Tokusai
Toyohide
Utakuni
Yoshifune
Yoshikuni I
Yoshikuni II
Yoshitaki
Yoshiume
Yoshiyuki

Ryūkōsai school (in Osaka)

Ryūkōsai Jokei (founder)
Shōkōsai Hanbei
Urakusai Nagahide

Shigenobu school

Yanagawa Shigenobu I (founder)
Yanagawa Shigenobu II
Tōrōsai Shigemitsu

Shunkōsai Fukushū school (in Osaka)

Shunkōsai Fukushū (founder)
Shunshosai Hokuchō
Gatōken Shunshi
Shunbaisai Hokuei (Shunkō III)
Seiyōsai Shunshi

Torii school

Torii Kiyomoto (founder)
Torii Kiyonobu I (co-founder)
Torii Kiyonobu II
Torii Kiyomasu I
Torii Kiyomasu II
Torii Kiyomitsu I
Torii Kiyotsune
Torii Kiyohiro
Torii Kiyosato
Torii Kiyonaga
Torii Kiyomasa I
Torii Kiyomine I
Hanegawa Chinchō
Kondō Kiyoharu
Torii Kiyotada
Katsukawa Terushige
Torii Kiyotomo
Torii Kiyoshige I
Torii Kotondo

Toyohara school

Toyohara Kunichika (founder)
Yōshū Chikanobu (Toyohara Chikanobu)
Watanabe Nobukazu
Toyohara Chikaharu
Morikawa Chikashige
Toyohara Chikayoshi
Toyohara Chikasato

Utagawa school

Utagawa Toyoharu (founder)
Utagawa Toyohiro
Utagawa Hirochika II
Utagawa Toyokuni I
Utagawa Kunimasa
Utagawa Kunisada (Toyokuni III)
Utagawa Kunisada II
Utagawa Kunisada III
Utagawa Sadahide
Utagawa Sadakage 
Utagawa Sadafusa
Utagawa Fusatane
Utagawa Sadahiro 
Utagawa Kuniteru II
Utagawa Kunimasu I (Sadamasu)
Utagawa Sadayoshi
Utagawa Kunihisa II
Utagawa Kunichika
Utagawa Kuniaki I
Utagawa Kuniaki II
Utagawa Kunimasa IV
Utagawa Kokunimasa
Utagawa Kunisato
Utagawa Kunitoshi
Utagawa Toyokuni II (Toyoshige)
Utagawa Kunitsuru 
Utagawa Kunimatsu
Utagawa Kuniteru III
Utagawa Kunimaru
Utagawa Kuniyasu
Utagawa Kuninao
Utagawa Kuniyoshi
Utagawa Yoshimune 
Utagawa Yoshiume
Utagawa Yoshitsuya 
Utagawa Yoshifuji
Utagawa Yoshiharu
Utagawa Yoshitoyo 
Utagawa Yoshimori 
Utagawa Yoshimasa
Utagawa Yoshitora
Kawanabe Kyōsai
Hayakawa Shōzan
Utagawa Yoshiiku
Kobayashi Ikuhide
Utagawa Yoshitama
Utagawa Yoshifusa
Utagawa Yoshitoshi
Utagawa Yoshikata
Utagawa Yoshikatsu
Utagawa Yoshijo
Utagawa Yoshinobu
Utagawa Yoshitorijo
Utagawa Yoshitsuna
Utagawa Yoshitsuru
Utagawa Yoshikazu
Utagawa Yoshitomi
Utagawa Kunikiyo
Utagawa Kunihisa
Utagawa Kunitora
Utagawa Kuniteru I
Utagawa Kunihiro
Ryusai Shigeharu
Utagawa Kunikage
Utagawa Kuninaga
Utagawa Hiroshige (Andō Hiroshige)
Utagawa Hiroshige II (Shigenobu)
Utagawa Hiroshige III
Risshō II
Shōsai Ikkei
Utagawa Shigemaru
Utagawa Shigekiyo
Utagawa Hirokage

Artists not associated with a particular school

Kanbun Master
Sharaku
Sawa Sekkyō
Setsuri
Toriyama Sekien
Ogata Gekkō
Sugimura Jihei
Kobayashi Kiyochika
Kikukawa Eizan

Notes

References
 Lane, Richard. (1978).  Images from the Floating World, The Japanese Print. Oxford: Oxford University Press. ;  OCLC 5246796
 Link, Howard A., The Theatrical Prints of the Torii Masters, A Selection of Seventeenth and Eighteenth-Century Ukiyo-e, Honolulu, Honolulu Academy of Arts, 1977.
 Newland, Amy Reigle. (2005). Hotei Encyclopedia of Japanese Woodblock Prints.  Amsterdam: Hotei. ;  OCLC 61666175
 Roberts, Laurance P., A Dictionary of Japanese Artists, Tokyo, Weatherhill, 1976.
 Ujlaki, Peter, Osaka Kabuki at the BM, Andon, Vol. 82, 2007, 56-72.

Ukiyo-e
Ukiyo-e